Li Yihuang (born October 1962) is a former Chinese politician and entrepreneur. He was the Vice Governor of Jiangxi and the President of Jiangxi Copper. On January 17, 2018, Li Yihuang was placed under investigation by the Communist Party's anti-corruption agency.

Career
Li Yihuang was born in Jinjiang, Fujian in October 1962. He graduated from Central South University, and started to work at Guixi Smelter of Jiangxi Copper since 1982.

In 2001, Li was appointed as the Vice Manager of Jiangxi Copper, later he promoted to the Manager and President.

In 2013, Li was appointed as the Vice Governor of Jiangxi.

Investigation
On January 17, 2018, Li Yihuang was placed under investigation by the Central Commission for Discipline Inspection, the party's internal disciplinary body, for "serious violations of regulations".

On April 26, 2018, Li Yihuang was stripped of his post and party membership.

On November 23, 2018, Li Yihuang stood trial for bribery, embezzlement, misappropriation of public funds and abuse of power at the Intermediate People's Court of Anqing in Anhui. Li took advantage of his different positions to benefit others in business cooperation, stock right transfers, project contracting and job adjustments. He was charged with accepting money and property worth more than 51.19 million yuan (about 7.4 million U.S. dollars) personally or through others between 2004 and 2017. Besides, he was also charged with plundering the public fund worth 2.68 million yuan, redirecting public fund worth 147 million yuan and abusing of power, stood trial at the Intermediate People's Court of Anqing in Anhui Province on November 23, 2018.

Sentence
On January 29, 2019, Li was sentenced on 18 years in prison and fined 2.2 million yuan ($327,600) for taking bribes, corruption and embezzlement of public funds.

References

1960 births
Chinese Communist Party politicians from Fujian
People's Republic of China politicians from Fujian
Political office-holders in Jiangxi
Businesspeople from Fujian
Living people
People from Jinjiang, Fujian
Central South University alumni
Politicians from Quanzhou